Patricia Waller (1962) is a textile artist from Santiago, Chile, who lives and works in Berlin, Germany. She is known for her bright cartoon style crochet work that often has a macabre element to it.

Biography

Waller was born in 1962 in Santiago, Chile. In 1968 Waller moved with her family to Germany. She studied at the Free Art School in Nürtingen from 1983 to 1985. She received her diploma and master's degree from the Academy of Fine Arts in Karlsruhe, studying sculpture there from 1985 to 1990.

She was a lecturer at the University of Applied Science in Pforzheim, Germany from 2002 to 2004; also at Textile Department in the Institute for Art and Art History at the University of Cologne from 2003 to 2004/ 2007; and at the Department Textile Studies and Research in the Institute for Cultural Studies and Social Science at the University of Osnabrück.

Artworks
In her final year of art school, Waller created her first crochet piece for which her practise is known.
The first artwork that Waller crocheted was a bomb. She then went on to re-create iconic pieces from art history like Joseph Beuys' dead hare or Jeff Koons' "Rabbit". She went on to create technology then medical inspired devises before settling into her iconic style of macabre cartoon images. Her work uses cute or kitsch crocheted forms that have a violent edge to them such known TV cartoon figures that are stabbed and bloody or stuffed animals that have been flattened by some mishap.

Selected solo exhibitions
 Innocent, 2019 Gallery Tobias Schrade, Ulm, Germany; 2018, Galerie Deschler, Berlin, Germany
 At the circus, 2016, Kunstverein Speyer, Germany; 2015, Gallery Deschler, Berlin, Germany; 2015, Kunstverein Nürtingen, Germany
 The violent needle, 2016, Shirley's Temple Art, Shanghai, China
 Broken Heroes, 2015, Gallery Tobias Schrade, Ulm, Germany; 2012, Gallery Deschler, Berlin, Germany
 Bad Luck, 2012, Gallery Tobias Schrade, Ulm, Germany; 2009, Kunsthalle Osnabrück, Germany; 2009, Gallery Deschler, Berlin, Germany
 Follow the thread, 2011, BWA Galeria, Zielona Góra, Poland; 2011, Museum junge Kunst, Frankfurt Oder, Germany
 Sailor's Yarn, 2004, Gallery Tobias Schrade, Ulm, Germany; 2003, Gallery Marcus Schmitz, Cologne, Germany
 Handmade, 2002, Gallery Metropolitana, Barcelona, Spain; 2002, EnBW Energie AG, Sonycenter, Berlin, Germany

Selected group exhibitions
My Hero! Bedford Gallery, 2016, Lesher Center for the Arts, CA, USA, and California Center of the Arts, Escondido, CA, USA
Neue Masche, 2011, Museum Bellerive, Museum für Gestaltung, Zurich, Switzerland 
Woven World, Internationale Triennial Textile Arts, 2011, Musée des Beaux-Arts de Tournai, BelgiumTrouble set me free, 2010, Margaret Lawrence Gallery, Melbourne, AustraliaLoops, 2010, Nordic house, Reykjavik, IcelandTen Years Hunting, 2010, Parker's Box, New York CityDritto Rovescio, 2009, Triannale Design Museum, Milan, ItalyInternational fiber biennial, 2008, Snyderman-Works Gallery, Philadelphia, USAD-Haus..D-Street, 2005–2006 Executive Committee German Year in Japan, Tokyo, Japan Left Hand, Right Hand'', 2003, 798 Space, Beijing, China

Honours, decorations, awards and distinctions
Art award of the Werner Stober Foundation, 2002
Scholarship Cité Internationale des Arts, 1999 Paris, France
One-year scholarship, 1995, Columbia College, Chicago, USA
DAAD-scholarship, 1993 Ghent, Belgium

References

External links
 http://www.patriciawaller.com/en/index.html

1962 births
Living people
Textile artists
20th-century Chilean women artists
20th-century women textile artists
20th-century textile artists
21st-century Chilean women artists
21st-century women textile artists
21st-century textile artists
German art educators
German women artists
German textile artists
Artists from Santiago
Chilean women sculptors